Orlando Irizarry Camacho (born September 27, 1985) is a professional male beach volleyball player from Puerto Rico who currently competes on the NORCECA Beach Volleyball Circuit. He competes with Roberto Rodríguez.

He also played at the AVP Young Guns 2009 at Fort Lauderdale  finishing in the 7th place.

At his college University of the Sacred Heart where he plays indoor volleyball as a setter, he was awarded for academic excellence.

References

External links
 North, Central America and Caribbean Volleyball Confederation (NORCECA)

1985 births
Living people
Puerto Rican men's beach volleyball players
21st-century Puerto Rican people